Dmitri Kulikov may refer to:

 Dmitri Kulikov (footballer) (born 1977), Estonian footballer
 Dmitry Kulikov (ice hockey) (born 1990), Russian ice hockey defenceman